Goldfinder is a 2001 autobiography of British diver and treasure hunter Keith Jessop.

The ship had been sunk in battle in 1942 during World War II while carrying payment for military equipment from Murmansk in Russia to Scotland. His company, called Jessop Marine, won the contract for the salvage rights to the wreck of Edinburgh because his methods, involving complex cutting machinery and divers, were deemed more appropriate for a war grave, compared to the explosives-oriented methods of other companies.

In late April 1981, the survey ship discovered the ship's final resting place at an approximate position of 72.00°N, 35.00°E, at a depth of  within ten days of the start of the operation. Using specialist camera equipment, Dammtor took detailed film of the wreck, which allowed Jessop and his divers to carefully plan the salvage operation.

Later that year, on 30 August, the dive-support vessel Stephaniturm journeyed to the site, and salvage operations began in earnest. Leading the operation undersea, by mid-September of that year Jessop was able to salvage over $100,000,000 in Russian gold bullion (431 bars) from the wreck out of 465 over several days making him the greatest underwater treasurer in history.

Jessop died on 22 May 2010.

References

Underwater diving books
2001 non-fiction books
British autobiographies